"Invincible" is a song by Chantal Kreviazuk and first single from her 2009 album, Plain Jane.

Charts

References

Chantal Kreviazuk songs
2009 singles
2009 songs
Songs written by Raine Maida
Songs written by Chantal Kreviazuk